Panda Bear, Panda Bear, What Do You See? is a 2003 children's picture book by Bill Martin, Jr. and illustrated by Eric Carle. Released by Henry Holt and Co., it is the third companion book to Brown Bear, Brown Bear, What Do You See?.

Plot summary
In rhyming text, various endangered animals are asked the question "What do you see?". The list of animals includes a panda bear, a bald eagle, a water buffalo, a spider monkey, a green sea turtle, a macaroni penguin, a sea lion, a red wolf, a whooping crane and a black panther. The last iteration is a dreaming child who sees all the animals "wild and free."

Reception
A Bella Online review says, "The book is a great tool to introduce conservation to youngsters. It is never too early, to introduce infants, toddlers and young children to the conservation of animals and natural resources." A Wonder Korner review says, "Bill Martin Jr. and Eric Carle have done it again! These popular collaborators have added a new book about animal conversations to their series of rhythmic animal books. The combined talent of Martin and Carle are bound to ensure this a spot on the shelves of children's classics. It was reviewed by Publishers Weekly and by Booklist.

Texas ban
In 2010, the book was banned in Texas when the Texas Education Agency confused author Bill Martin, Jr. with leftist philosopher Bill Martin.

References

External links
Bear book sales will benefit kids' health

2003 children's books
American picture books
Henry Holt and Company books
Picture books by Eric Carle
Fictional pandas
Books about bears